Knar or KNAR may refer to:
 
Joseph Knar (1800–1864), Austrian mathematician
KNAR, San Angelo, Texas radio station on 89.3  See List of Air1 stations
Knar Haykakan, a pioneering Armenian musical periodical

See also
Josh "Gnar" Brainard, member of band Slipknot
Gnar Tapes, American independent record label